The men's 110 metres hurdles event at the 1963 Summer Universiade was held at the Estádio Olímpico Monumental in Porto Alegre on 5 September 1963.

Medalists

Results

Heats

Final

References

Athletics at the 1963 Summer Universiade
1963